Jacques Clancy (17 May 1920 - 19 May 2012) was a French actor, sociétaire of the Comédie-Française.

Filmography 
 1938 : Carrefour by Kurt Bernhardt
 1945 : A Friend Will Come Tonight by Raymond Bernard - Jacques Leroy
 1950 : Darling Caroline by Richard Pottier - Georges Berthier
 1950 : Sous le ciel de Paris by Julien Duvivier - Armand Maistre
 1951 : Two Pennies Worth of Violets by Jean Anouilh - André Delgrange
 1952 : The Green Glove by Rudolph Maté and Louis A. Pascal - Ivan
 1953 : The Lady of the Camellias  by Raymond Bernard - Gaston Rieux
 1954 : The Red and the Black by Claude Autant-Lara
 1955 : Impasse des vertus by Pierre Méré - Le docteur Alain Delaunay
 1955 : Marguerite de la nuit de Claude Autant-Lara - Angelo
 1956 : Un matin comme les autres by Yannick Bellon - short film - Le commissaire
 1957 : In Case of Adversity by Claude Autant-Lara - Maître Duret, l'assistant de l'avocat Maître Gobillot

Theatre 
 1939 : Asmodée by François Mauriac, Jacques Copeau - Harry Fanning
 1942 : On ne badine pas avec l'amour by Alfred de Musset, mise en scène Louis Jouvet, tour in South America  
 1949 : Joanna of Castile by François Aman-Jean, mise en scène Jean Meyer, Comédie-Française at  Théâtre de l'Odéon
 1950 : La Belle Aventure by Gaston Arman de Caillavet, Robert de Flers and Étienne Rey, mise en scène Jean Debucourt, Comédie-Française
 1950 : Les Sincères by Marivaux, mise en scène Véra Korène, Comédie-Française 
 1957 : Histoire de rire by Armand Salacrou, mise en scène Jean Meyer,  Théâtre des Célestins

External links 
 

Troupe of the Comédie-Française
Sociétaires of the Comédie-Française
French male stage actors
French male film actors
People from Gironde
1920 births
2012 deaths